Alfred Buckwalter Garner (March 4, 1873 – July 30, 1930) was a Republican member of the U.S. House of Representatives from Pennsylvania.

Biography
Alfred B. Garner was born in Ashland, Pennsylvania.  He studied law, was admitted to the bar in 1897 and commenced practice in Ashland.  He served as a member of the Pennsylvania State House of Representatives from 1901 to 1907.

Garner was elected as a Republican to the Sixty-first Congress.  He was again a member of the State House of Representatives from 1915 to 1917.  He resumed the practice of law in Ashland and served as the taxing officer of the auditor general's department in Harrisburg, Pennsylvania, until his death in Harrisburg.  He was interred at Fountain Spring Cemetery in Fountain Springs, Pennsylvania.

Sources

The Political Graveyard

Republican Party members of the Pennsylvania House of Representatives
Pennsylvania lawyers
Politicians from Harrisburg, Pennsylvania
People from Ashland, Pennsylvania
1873 births
1930 deaths
Republican Party members of the United States House of Representatives from Pennsylvania